The 2006 TSFA season was the eighth regular season of the Texas Sixman Football League.

2006 brought another name change to the Texas Sixman Football Association (TSFA).  The reason for this change was the creation of a sister league in Tampa, FL named the Florida Sixman Football Association (FSFA).  There was also a large turnover from 2005 with four teams leaving the league and being replaced promptly by other teams.

Teams
The last remaining original team of the SFA folded prior to the 2006 season.  The Red Raiders and Rhinos continued for their seventh seasons.  The Bandits, Bucs, Longhorns, Rage and Wolverines entered their sixth year of competition.  The Six-Pack entered into their fifth season of play.  The Hurricanes, Ruff Ryders and Wrecking Crew returned for their second seasons.  The Punishers folded after one season the most of their players went to the Panthers.  A large number of Mad Dogs players went over and helped jump-start the Gladiators while the Warriors and Jets joined the league.

The Northern Conference consisted of the Bandits, Bucs, Hurricanes, Jets, Longhorns, Panthers, Six-Pack and Warriors.  The Southern Conference consisted of the Gladiators, Rage, Red Raiders, Rhinos, Ruff Ryders, Wolverines and Wrecking Crew.

References

External links
Texas Sixman Football League 

American football in Texas
2006 in American football